Demining robot is a robotic land vehicle that is designed for detecting and clearing land mines. Demining robots are designed for spotting the exact location of land mines. Practicing demining without demining robot can be costly and dangerous for people, especially if the environment is dull or dirty, or otherwise dangerous to humans, it is then very well-suited for demining robots. Some manufacturers test and inspect rigorously before releasing demining robots for service.

Models

Uran-6
Uran-6 is a demining robot model used by Russian Federation.

MV-4 Dok-Ing
MV-4 Dok-Ing is a demining robot model used by Republic of Croatia.

See also
Lawnmower robot
Vacuum cleaner robot

References

Bomb disposal
Military robots
Mine warfare